The third Gladstone ministry was one of the shortest-lived ministries in British history. It was led by William Gladstone of the Liberal Party upon his reappointment as Prime Minister of the United Kingdom by Queen Victoria. It lasted five months until July 1886.

Formation

The Liberal Party under the leadership of William Gladstone came to power in the United Kingdom in February 1886 after they, with the support of the Irish Nationalists, defeated the Conservative government of Lord Salisbury. The ministry was to become one of the most short-lived in British history. Gladstone, aged 76, became Prime Minister of the United Kingdom for the third time. Sir William Vernon Harcourt became Chancellor of the Exchequer, Hugh Childers Home Secretary and future Prime Minister the Earl of Rosebery Foreign Secretary. Lord Selborne and Sir Henry James both rejected the Lord Chancellorship, a post, which, however, was accepted by Sir Farrer Herschell, who was ennobled as Baron Herschell. Former Foreign Secretary Lord Granville became Secretary of State for the Colonies, while another political veteran, Lord Kimberley, resumed the post of Secretary of State for India which he had held from 1882 to 1885. The influential Joseph Chamberlain was appointed President of the Local Government Board while future party leader and Prime Minister Henry Campbell-Bannerman was made Secretary of State for War. The government also saw John Morley hold his first ministerial post as Chief Secretary for Ireland.

The ministry is chiefly remembered for Gladstone's first attempt to introduce the Home Rule Bill for Ireland. The bill was defeated by a majority of 30 (93 Liberal MP's having voted against it) on 8 June and on 26 June Parliament was dissolved. The issue split the Liberal Party. Lord Hartington, who had refused to serve under Gladstone because of his Irish policies, became leader of the Liberal Unionists. He was joined by Joseph Chamberlain, who had resigned over Home Rule in April.

Fate
The Conservative Party, with the support of the Liberal Unionists, gained a decisive victory in the July 1886 general election, and Lord Salisbury once again became Prime Minister. The Liberals were to remain out of office until 1892, when Gladstone became Prime Minister for a fourth time.

Cabinet

February 1886 to August 1886

Changes
April 1886: James Stansfeld succeeds Joseph Chamberlain at the Local Government Board. George Otto Trevelyan leaves the Cabinet.  His successor as Secretary for Scotland is not in the Cabinet.

List of ministers
Cabinet members are listed in bold face.

Notes

References
 C. Cook and B. Keith, British Historical Facts 1830–1900, pp. 38–39.

British ministries
Government
1886 establishments in the United Kingdom
Ministries of Queen Victoria
Ministry 3
1886 disestablishments in the United Kingdom
Cabinets established in 1886
Cabinets disestablished in 1886
1880s in the United Kingdom